Malešević is a Serbian or Croatian surname. It may refer to:

Dragan Malešević Tapi (1949–2002), painter
Nebojša Malešević (born 1983), fashion model
Nikola Malešević (born 1989), basketball player
Sinisa Malesevic (born 1969), sociologist
Snežana Maleševič (born 1985), footballer
Tijana Malešević (born 1991), volleyball player

Serbian surnames